Videoland is a Dutch OTT online service provider owned by RTL Nederland. Originally it was a retail chain of video rental stores. Its main competitor is Netflix.

History
Videoland was founded by Nico Broersen and Gerard van Stijn and opened its first video rental store in 1984. From 1992 to 1996 Philips was the owner, and took over the management in the Netherlands. In 2004, the 200th store opened.

By the end of the first decade of the 21st century, video stores came more and more under pressure due to the rise of Video-on-Demand services. Parent company Entertainment Retail Group filed for bankruptcy in 2010. The Videoland formula and franchise were then acquired by Moving Pictures Holding.

Video-on-Demand Service
Videoland on Demand is available since 2010 and RTL Nederland took a share of 65% in 2013. Since 2015 Videoland on Demand is fully owned by RTL Nederland. The rental stores closed their doors.

Since 2015, the company has also been producing its own programs for its video-on-demand service.

Awards
 In the fall of 2018, Videoland won a Hashtag Award in the category  Best Video on Demand  with the series Mocro Maffia.
 In May 2020, Videoland won two The Best Social Awards in the categories Best Positive Impact and Best Launch with the documentary Bont Girl, by Famke Louise.

References

External links
 

RTL Nederland
RTL Group
Video rental services
Video on demand services
Dutch companies established in 1984